Nivaan Sen, also known as Naveen Sen, is an Indian actor and producer. His production house name is 'Urban Boat Films'. He is known for his role in the Indian daily soaps Kahaani Ghar Ghar Kii, Pyaar Ka Dard Hai Meetha Meetha Pyaara Pyaara and Do Hanson Ka Jodaa. Nivaan Sen was awarded a Best Actor Award in Comedy for India's Best Cinestars Ki Khoj in 2004.

Early life and background 
Nivaan Sen was born and brought up in Varanasi, Uttar Pradesh. He has been involved in the theatre since childhood. He did his schooling from C. M. Anglo Bengali Inter College. He has played football since childhood, running from Uttar Pradesh. He completed his graduation and post-graduation from Mahatma Gandhi Kashi Vidyapeeth, Varanasi. He did his post-graduation in sociology.

Career 
Nivaan Sen started his career with the talent show India's Best Cinestars Ki Khoj, and he also won the title of India's Best Performance in Comic Role. He has appeared in several television shows such as Kahaani Ghar Ghar Kii in October 2007, most of which aired on Star Plus. In 2010, he worked on the TV serial Do Hanson Ka Jodaa, airing on NDTV Imagine.

Filmography

Television 

|

Films

Web series

Producer

Awards and nominations

References

External links 
 Nivaan Sen at the Internet Movie Database

Living people
Male actors in Hindi cinema
Indian male film actors
21st-century Indian male actors
Indian male soap opera actors
Indian male television actors
Male actors from Varanasi
Year of birth missing (living people)